The Roman Catholic Diocese of Mouila is a diocese located in the city of Mouila in the Ecclesiastical province of Libreville in Gabon.

History
 11 December 1958: Established as Diocese of Mouila from the Diocese of Libreville

Bishops of Mouila
 Raymond-Marie-Joseph de La Moureyre, C.S.Sp. (14 May 1959 – 28 October 1976)
 Cyriaque Siméon Obamba (28 October 1976 – 22 April 1992)
 Dominique Bonnet, C.S.Sp. (8 November 1996 – 19 January 2013)
 Mathieu Madega Lebouakehan (19 January 2013 – present); transferred from Port-Gentil

See also
Roman Catholicism in Gabon

References

External links
 GCatholic.org
 Catholic Hierarchy

Mouila
Christian organizations established in 1958
Roman Catholic dioceses and prelatures established in the 20th century
1958 establishments in Gabon
Roman Catholic Ecclesiastical Province of Libreville